Billboard Top Rock'n'Roll Hits: 1969 is a compilation album released by Rhino Records in 1989, featuring 10 hit recordings from 1969.

The original album includes six songs that reached the top of the Billboard Hot 100 chart, including the year's No. 1 song, "Sugar, Sugar" by The Archies. The remaining four tracks each reached the Hot 100's Top 5.  A 1993 re-issue replaced three tracks, bringing the number of chart toppers down from six to five.  On the re-issue, a cover of the title track from the musical "Hair" was replaced with another cover from that musical: "Good Morning Starshine."

The album was certified Gold by the RIAA on July 16, 1996.

Track listing 

1989 original release

1993 re-release, replacement tracks

References 

1989 compilation albums
Billboard Top Rock'n'Roll Hits albums